The Golden Arrow is a 1962 Italian peplum film directed by Antonio Margheriti.

Synopsis
Damascus is governed by the fierce tyrant Baktiar, who will be forced to give up his throne once his daughter Jamila is married. As Jamila falls in love with the mysterious Hassan, Baktiar will try in every way to prevent their marriage.

Cast
 Tab Hunter as Hassan
 Rossana Podestà as Jamila
 Mario Feliciani as the tyrant Baktiar 
 Umberto Melnati as Thin Genie
 Giustino Durano as Absent-Minded Genie
 José Jaspe as Sabrath  
 Renato Baldini as Prince of Basra
 Dominique Boschero as Queen of Rocky Valley  
 Gloria Milland as Queen in the cave
 Franco Scandurra as Bearded Genie

Production
Hunter later recalled in his memoirs:
Not being able to speak Italian wasn't a drawback. The script of La Freccia d'Oro - my copy was the only one in English - featured page after page of truly horrendous dialogue... All I could think of was Tony Curtis in The Prince Who Was a Thief (1951): "Yonda lies da castle of my fadda." I spend every night in my hotel, rewriting my lines so I'd at least have fun delivering them. I camped it up shamelessly. Not that it mattered - all my dialogue was eventually dubbed by a stiff-as-a-board Italian baritone with no sense of humor. I ended up sounding like Rossano Brazzi. Disappointment over being stuck in a stinker was eased considerably by weekly infusions of cash, delivered personally by the production manager. I'd sign a voucher and he'd hand over a bundle of lire, some of the old notes as big as place mats.

Release
The Golden Arrow was released in Italy on September 7, 1962. It was released in the United States in May 1964. The film was not a box office hit and cost so much money it almost bankrupted Titanus, the production company.

Reception
From contemporary reviews, an anonymous reviewer in the Monthly Film Bulletin noted that the special effects and trick photography were "of unusually variable quality-distinctly poor in the Egyptian city episode, though spectacular enough in the fiery cavern with the flaming men." and that "the film suffers further from a lack of dash, and from Tab Hunter's weak playing of the hero."

From retrospective reviews, the author of the book Il grande cinema fantasy described the film as "a typical adventure B-movie, especially interesting for its fantasy elements, which is damaged by the presence of comic elements that do not bind enough with the rest." The film still gained recognition for sporting particularly elaborate sets and costumes.

See also
 List of Italian films of 1962

References

Footnotes

Sources

External links
 
 
 

1962 films
1960s fantasy adventure films
Italian fantasy adventure films
1960s Italian-language films
English-language Italian films
Films directed by Antonio Margheriti
Films scored by Mario Nascimbene
Films set in Damascus
Titanus films
1960s Italian films